Milaki or Mileki or Meylaki may refer to:
 Milaki, Hormozgan

See also
 Milak, Iran (disambiguation)
 Maleki (disambiguation)